Horace Mann (1796–1859) was an American education reformer.

Horace Mann may also refer to:

 Horace Mann Bond (1904–1972), American historian and father of civil-rights leader Julian Bond
 Horace Mann Jr. (1844–1868), American botanist
 Horace Mann Towner (1855–1937), American politician 
 Sir Horace Mann, 1st Baronet (1706–1786), diplomat, long standing British resident in Florence, known for his correspondence with Horace Walpole
 Sir Horatio Mann, 2nd Baronet (1744–1814), member of Parliament and cricket patron, nephew of Sir Horace Mann, 1st Baronet

See also
Horace Mann Historic District, Gary, Indiana, United States
Horace Mann, Indiana, one of the former neighborhoods forming Ambridge Mann neighborhood, Indiana, United States
 Horace Mann School (disambiguation)
 Horace Mann Educators Corporation